Srbac is a town in Republika Srpska, an entity of Bosnia and Herzegovina, located about  north of Banja Luka. As of 2013, it has a population of 17,587 inhabitants, while the town of Srbac has a population of 2,707 inhabitants.

Geography

Physical geography 

The area around Srbac is mountainous woodland to the south-east (40% of the total area) and farmland to the south-west (60% of total area). The city itself is built in the Pannonian plain, which is located on the transition between low mountain areas and flat farmlands. The mountain ranges to the south-east are called Motajica and the highest peak is called Gradina at 652m above sea level. The lowest point is 89m in the small village of Vlaknica along the Sava river.

Political geography 
The Municipality of Srbac is located in the northeastern part of Bosnia and Hercegovina's entity Republika Srpska and borders the municipalities of Derventa, Prnjavor, Laktaši and Gradiška and has a 42km long border with Croatia. The Municipality of Srbac covers an area of 453 km2 (174.9 mi2) and consists of 39 villages.

Climate
Srbac has a continental climate, with harsh winters and warm summers. The warmest month of the year is July, with an average temperature of 25°C (77°F). The coldest month of the year is January, when temperatures average -5°C (23 °F).
Annual precipitation for Srbac is about 875 mm. Due to the city's high latitude; it snows in Srbac almost every year as well. Strong winds come from the north and northeast bringing much snow.

History

Archaeological evidence points to an Iron Age settlement existing in the region (Cagan grad). Before the collapse of the Western Roman Empire the town was mentioned in this area. As throughout in the Balkans during Ottoman occupation, towns were constantly burnt and destroyed. In the cadastral area of modern Srbac the historical town of Svinjar existed (meaning "swine stable").

Ottoman era 
At the time of the Long War (1591–1606), Ahmet Hafiz-pasha transported his huge army from Ottoman-held Slavonia across the Sava at Svinjar further into Bosnia (1596). During Ottoman occupation the region was part of the Sanjak of Bosnia. Svinjar was one of the important rebel sites in Bosnia during the Herzegovina Uprising (1875–78) against the Ottoman Empire; one of the battles took place here on 21 November 1875 at a place called Srbac where hajduks of Motajica burnt down and destroyed an Ottoman military camp.

Austria-Hungary 
In the late 19th century Svinjar was under Austro-Hungary. In 1888 a primary school was opened in Svinjar. Between the years of 1899 to 1921 around 7,000 Poles and around 5,000 Ukrainians migrated and settled in the area. Towards the end of 1929 a medical centre was also opened in Svinjar. On 2 November 1933 the minister of internal affairs of the Kingdom of Yugoslavia changed the town name into Srbac.

Yugoslavia 
During World War II these parts were frequently invaded by all the warring sides. During the 1970s Srbac saw rapid growth with the opening of a new textile factory and a packaging material factory. However, economic growth stopped during the Bosnian War. Srbac was bombarded 3 times during the war by Croatian forces in the summer of 1992 only. No one was killed in these 3 incidents and Srbac suffered only minor structural damage.

Demographics

Population 
According to the 2013 census results, the municipality has 17,587, while the town of Srbac had the population of 2,707 inhabitants.

Ethnic composition

See also
 Municipalities of Republika Srpska

References

External links

 Official website

Populated places in Srbac
Cities and towns in Republika Srpska
Srbac
Bosnia and Herzegovina–Croatia border crossings